Band Bon (also known as Bandbon-e Asadollāh) is a village in Tameshkol Rural District, Nashta District, Tonekabon County, Mazandaran Province, Iran. At the 2006 census, its population was 248, in 63 families.

References 

Populated places in Tonekabon County